William Dolman Bees VC (12 September 1871 – 20 June 1938) was an English recipient of the Victoria Cross, the highest and most prestigious award for gallantry in the face of the enemy that can be awarded to British and Commonwealth forces.

Born in Midsomer Norton, Somerset he was 29 years old, and a private in the 1st Battalion, The Derbyshire Regiment (later The Sherwood Foresters), British Army during the Second Boer War when the following deed took place on 30 September 1901 at Moedwil, South Africa for which he was awarded the VC:

He later achieved the rank of corporal. His Victoria Cross is displayed at the Sherwood Foresters Museum at Nottingham Castle, England.

References

Monuments to Courage (David Harvey, 1999)
The Register of the Victoria Cross (This England, 1997)
Victoria Crosses of the Anglo-Boer War (Ian Uys, 2000)

External links
Location of grave and VC medal (Leicestershire)
VictoriaCross.net
Anglo-Boer War

1871 births
1938 deaths
Burials in Leicestershire
Military personnel from Somerset
People from Midsomer Norton
Sherwood Foresters soldiers
British recipients of the Victoria Cross
Second Boer War recipients of the Victoria Cross
British Army personnel of the Second Boer War
British military personnel of the Tirah campaign
British Army personnel of World War I
British Army recipients of the Victoria Cross